215 most commonly refers to:

 215 (number)
 215 AD, a year
 215 BC, a year

215 may also refer to:

Arts, entertainment, and media

Events
 UFC 215, a 2017 mixed martial arts event in Alberta, Canada

Literature
 Lectionary 215, a Greek manuscript
 Minuscule 215, a Greek minuscule manuscript

Government and military
 215th Battalion (Canada), a unit in the Canadian Expeditionary Force
 215th Brigade (United Kingdom), a Home Service formation of the British Army
 215th Infantry Division (Wehrmacht), a major military unit of the Nazi German Army
 215th Pennsylvania Infantry Regiment, an infantry regiment of the Union Army of the United States
 215th Rifle Division, an infantry division of the Red Army of the Soviet Union
 PEC 215, a proposed constitutional amendment to the constitution of Brazil
 VMF-215, a fighter squadron of the United States Marine Corps
 VPB-215, a Patrol Bombing Squadron of the United States Navy

Transportation

Aircraft
 Canadair CL-215, a Canadian amphibious aircraft
 Dornier Do 215, a German light bomber
 Ikarus 215, a Yugoslav light bomber
 Prue 215, an American high-wing glider

Buses
 MAZ-215, a Belarusian low-floor articulated bus

Engines
 2si 215, a line of two-stroke aircraft engines
 RD-215, a dual nozzle liquid rocket engine
 RK 215, a line of diesel engines built by MAN

Rail transportation
 215 series, a bilevel suburban train type used by East Japan Railway Corporation
 DB Class 215, a German 4 axle diesel locomotive

Roads
 List of highways numbered 215, a list of highways named 215
 215th Street (Manhattan)
 Interstate 215 (disambiguation), a disambiguation of interstate highways named 215

Spacecraft
 Kosmos 215, a Soviet satellite
 USA-215, an American reconnaissance satellite

Transit routes and stations
 215 (MBTA bus), a bus route in Boston, Massachusetts, United States
 215th Street station, a local station on the IRT Broadway–Seventh Avenue Line of the New York City Subway
 215th Street (Cedar Busway station), a bus station on the Metro Red Line in the Twin Cities of Minnesota, United States

Watercraft
 German submarine U-215, a Type VIID mine-laying U-boat in Nazi Germany's Kriegsmarine
 Soviet submarine Shch-215, a Shchuka-class submarine in the Soviet Navy
 USCGC Sequoia (WLB-215), seagoing buoy tender in the United States Coast Guard
 USS Borie (DD-215), a Clemson-class destroyer in the United States Navy
 USS Growler (SS-215), a Gato-class submarine in the United States Navy

Other uses
 215 Oenone, an asteroid
 Area code 215, an area code in Pennsylvania, United States
 Nokia 215, a dual-band feature phone
 The unmarked graves of the 215 children found at the Kamloops Residential School